George Vaughn Horton (born Broad Top, Pennsylvania, June 5, 1911; died New Port Richey, Florida, February 29, 1988) was an American songwriter and performer. Usually credited as "Vaughn Horton" or "George Vaughn", he wrote or contributed to the success of a number of popular songs, including Choo Choo Ch'Boogie, Hillbilly Fever, Sugar-Foot Rag, Mockin' Bird Hill, and the Christmas song Jolly Old Saint Nicholas.

Early life
Vaughn Horton and his brother Roy Horton were the sons of coal miner Scott George Horton (1885-1950) and his wife Eunice Waite Horton (1884-1966) in a small community in the Alleghany Mountains of south central Pennsylvania. Vaughn, a guitarist, and Roy, a fiddler, got their start in music playing country music at roadhouses along the nearby Lincoln Highway. After attending Penn State University for a while, Vaughn moved to Philadelphia and New York, finding work singing country music on the radio and later record producing and playing at recording sessions.

The Pinetoppers
In New York Vaughn and Roy Horton formed a "hillbilly band" named the Pinetoppers, with Vaughn as the leader and chief composer/songwriter. The Pinetoppers sometimes backed other Coral Records artists on recordings, such as Ray Smith, Bill Darnel, and Kenny Roberts, and sometimes worked on their own. They scored three charting records on their own, all in 1951 - their version of Horton's Mockin' Bird Hill (#10 US, #3 country), another Horton tune, "Metro Polka" (#12 country), and Cy Coben's "Lonely Little Robin" (#14 US, #11 country), which also featured Pinetoppers' collaborators Ray Smith and the Marlin Sisters.

The Pinetoppers had three albums on Coral Records - "As Introduced By the Pinetoppers" (1950), "The Pinetoppers" (1956), and "Square Dances (Without Calls)" (10"; date unknown) - and many singles between 1947 and 1956.

Songwriting
With fellow New York-based country musician Denver Darling, Horton started writing songs, contributing "Don't Hang Around Me Anymore" to Gene Autry, who took it to number four on the country charts in 1945. Another Darling/Horton tune, with another writing credit for producer Milt Gabler, was "Choo Choo Ch'Boogie", recorded by bandleader Louis Jordan and his Tympany Five in January 1946; it topped the R&B charts for 18 weeks starting in August of 1946. 

In 1947 the Sons of the Pioneers recorded Horton's "Teardrops in My Heart" and took it to #4 on the country charts; the song became a standard and charted for many other artists in later years - Theresa Brewer (1957), Joe Barry (1961), Rex Allen Jr. (1976), and Marty Robbins (1981). 

In 1948 Horton wrote English lyrics for Artur Beul's 1944 song "Nach em Räge schint Sunne" and named it "Toolie Oolie Doolie (The Yodel Polka)". The Andrews Sisters' version became a hit and went to number 3 on the national charts. Horton's own version, by "Vaughn Horton and His Polka Debs", charted at #11, as did one by "Sportsmen", while two other versions, by the Marlin Sisters and by bandleader Henri René, made it to #30.

In 1949 versions of Horton's "Till the End of the World" made the country charts for three different artists - Jimmy Wakely (#9), Ernest Tubb (#4), and Johnny Bond (#12). Bing Crosby's 1952 version charted #16 popular, #10 country. Horton also collaborated with Hank Garland on Sugar-Foot Rag, which sold over a million copies for Garland; a 1979 Jimmie Reed recording of it also charted. In the same year Russ Morgan took Horton's "Barroom Polka" to #20 on the pop charts.

Horton's "Hillbilly Fever", a song commenting on the growing popularity of country music, was a hit for Little Jimmie Dickens in 1950; a slightly revised "Hillbilly Fever #2" was almost as successful for Ernest Tubb and Red Foley. 

Horton's last major hit was Mockin' Bird Hill in 1951; Horton added lyrics to an old Swedish waltz by accordionist Calle Jularbo. It was first recorded by Les Paul with Mary Ford, and then by Patti Page, both versions went to number 2 on the charts. In addition to the Pinetoppers' version, versions by Russ Morgan and Rosalie Allen & Elton Britt also made the charts. In 1977 Donna Fargo revived the song and took it back to #9 on the country charts. The song even charted (#10) in England in a 1964 version by The Migil Five.

A minor hit in 1951 was the "Metro Polka", a tune credited to Horton and Willie Evans; while the Pinetoppers charted it on the country charts, Frankie Laine took it to #19 on the pop charts.

After 1951 Horton continued to write and play, but had less success. Horton rewrote the lyrics of "Wabash Cannonball" to create "Big Wheel Cannonball", a song about trucking that charted for Dick Todd (1967) and Dick Curless (1970). On the same 1970 album Curless also recorded a Horton tune titled the "Drag 'Em Off the Interstate, Sock It to 'Em, J.P. Blues", which made it to #29 on the country charts. In 1968 veteran country singer Elton Britt had a minor hit (#26 country) with Horton's "The Jimmie Rodgers Blues". In 1972 Roy Clark recorded Horton's novelty commentary on changes in network television, "The Lawrence Welk-Hee Haw Counter-Revolution Polka", and it reached number 9 on the Billboard Hot Country Singles chart.

Horton is often credited with Jimmie Rodgers on "Mule Skinner Blues"; his contribution was to produce a modernized version of the lyrics in 1950 which Bill Monroe recorded as "The New Mule-Skinner Blues" - although Monroe apparently continued to use the original words in concert. Another Horton fix-up job was the Christmas song Jolly Old Saint Nicholas; Horton re-arranged the original verses and added some new ones for a 1949 recording by Ray Smith, but many artists continued to use the older words. On the B-side of Ray Smith's single of "Jolly Old Saint Nicholas" was "An Old Christmas Card", another Horton Christmas song that has had some success - Jim Reeves put it on his popular 1963 Christmas album Twelve Songs of Christmas, for example.

Horton was elected to the Nashville Songwriters Hall of Fame in 1971.

Family
Horton's wife was Margaret Beatrice (Mellott) Horton (1914-1986). They had seven children, six sons and a daughter, of which George Vaughn Horton Jr. (1932-2011) was the oldest.

References

1911 births
1988 deaths
People from Bedford County, Pennsylvania
Musicians from Pennsylvania
Songwriters from Pennsylvania
20th-century American musicians